Hilberry is a surname. Notable people with the surname include:

 Conrad Hilberry (1928–2017), American poet and author
 Norman Hilberry (1899–1986), American physicist

See also
 Hilberry Gateway, performing arts theatre
 Hilberry Theatre, auditorium
 Malcolm Hilbery (1883–1965), British judge